Sigurbergur Sigsteinsson (born 10 February 1948) is an Icelandic former handball player who competed in the 1972 Summer Olympics.

References

1948 births
Living people
Sigurbergur Sigsteinsson
Sigurbergur Sigsteinsson
Handball players at the 1972 Summer Olympics